Avoca School District 37 is a school district in the Chicago metropolitan area. Its headquarters are in Marie Murphy School in Wilmette, which has middle school and preschool levels. It also operates Avoca West School, with elementary grades, in Glenview. In addition to portions of Glenview and Wilmette, it serves portions of Northfield, Winnetka, and some unincorporated areas with Winnetka postal addresses. It feeds into New Trier Township High School District 203. The name "Avoca", meaning "Fountain of Knowledge", is a Gaelic word.

History
The district was established in 1870. It used a wood building until the construction of a brick one in 1923. The former wood building was moved and turned into residences located in Northfield.

Schools
The current Murphy School building, named after former superintendent Marie J. Murphy (died 1999), opened in 1992. Prior to 1968 it was known as Avoca Junior High School, and was previously the Avoca School. Its previous 1923 structure, two stories, was made with brick. It was a two-room facility until it was expanded to four rooms in 1930.

Avoca West Elementary School in Glenview was constructed in 1959.

Avoca Center is located in the former Avoca East Elementary School in Wilmette, which was built in 1957. It received six additional classrooms in 1961.

Services
As per the Wilmette Community Special Education Agreement (WCSEA), Avoca sends students with severe disabilities to Wilmette School District 39. The Avoca district used the North Suburban Special Education District (NSSED) until 2008, when it switched to the Wilmette district to save money.

References

External links
 

School districts in Cook County, Illinois
Wilmette, Illinois
Glenview, Illinois
Northfield, Illinois
1870 establishments in Illinois
School districts established in 1870